Viktor Martyan (born 20 September 1994 in Veremiivka, Cherkasy Oblast, Ukraine) is a professional Ukrainian football striker who plays for Dnipro Cherkasy.

Career
Martyan is a product of youth team systems of FC Molod Poltava. In August 2012 he signed contract with FC Chornomorets.

In April 2017 he signed a half year deal with Torpshammars IF in the Swedish Football Division 4.

References

Honours 
Krystal Kherson
Ukrainian Second League: 2019–20

External links
 
 

1994 births
Living people
Ukrainian footballers
FC Krystal Kherson players
MFC Mykolaiv players
FC Dnipro Cherkasy players
Ukrainian expatriate footballers
Expatriate footballers in Sweden
Expatriate footballers in Armenia
Ukrainian expatriate sportspeople in Sweden
Ukrainian expatriate sportspeople in Armenia
Association football forwards
Ukrainian Second League players
Sportspeople from Cherkasy Oblast